Ernst Andreas Dominicus Dronke (17 August 1822, Koblenz – 2 November 1891, Liverpool) was a German writer and journalist.  Because of his philosophical beliefs, Dronke became a "true socialist".  Later he became a member of the Communist League and became an editor of the Neue Rheinische Zeitung.  He participated in the German uprising of 1848-1849; after the suppression of this uprising, Dronke emigrated to England.  Subsequently, he withdrew from politics.

References

1822 births
1891 deaths
German socialists
German revolutionaries